Tilred of Lindisfarne (died ) was Bishop of Lindisfarne between around 915 and until his death around 925.

Prior to moving to Lindisfarne Tilred had been the abbot of Heversham in Cumbria.  It has been surmised that Tilred dedicated the monastery at Heversham to St Cuthbert (the patron saint of Lindisfarne) at some point after 901 so that he may later be accepted into the monastery there.  If this was the case it obviously appears to have worked.

Tilred probably transferred across to Lindisfarne due to a fear of Scandinavian settlers, who were appearing in the Heversham area at that time.

Citations

References
 
 History of Heversham Church accessed on August 29, 2007

External links
 

920s deaths
Roman Catholic monks
Bishops of Lindisfarne
10th-century English bishops
Year of birth unknown

Year of death uncertain